Introducing Lobo is the debut album by Lobo, released in 1971 on Big Tree Records.

The album peaked at #178 on the Billboard 200 in its first release. It was re-released in 1973 and peaked at #163 on the same chart. "Me and You and a Dog Named Boo" peaked at #5 on the Billboard Hot 100, becoming his first top 40 hit. It also became his first #1 on the Adult Contemporary chart, staying on top for 2 consecutive weeks in May 1971.

Track listing

Personnel
Production
Producer: Phil Gernhard
Engineer: Ron Johnson
Photography: Ernest Braun

Charts
Album

Singles

References

External links

1971 debut albums
Big Tree Records albums
Lobo (musician) albums